The 1985–86 Irish Cup was the 106th edition of Northern Ireland's premier football knock-out cup competition. It concluded on 3 May 1986 with the final.

Glentoran were the defending champions after winning their 11th Irish Cup last season, defeating archrivals Linfield 1–0 in the 1985 final replay, after the first game ended 1–1. They successfully defended the cup by beating Coleraine 2–1 in the final. In doing so, they became the first club in 18 years to win the trophy in consecutive seasons. Crusaders were the last club to achieve it, winning the 1967 and 1968 finals.

This season also saw second replays abolished in rounds, though they would still be used to decide the final if necessary. The first tie to be affected by the change was the first round tie between Dungannon Swifts and Tobermore United. Dungannon Swifts won the tie 6–5 on penalties when the replay ended 0–0 after extra time. The old rules would have required a second replay to be played at a neutral venue after the first replay was drawn.

Results

First round
Cliftonville and Crusaders both received byes into the second round.

|}

Replays

|}

Second round

|}

Replays

|}

Quarter-finals

|}

Semi-finals

|}

Final

References

1985-86
1985–86 domestic association football cups
Cup